Don't Sweat That (Whistle Song) is a single released by Dr. Stay Dry. It features American R&B singer and rapper Lumidee and samples music from the movie Twisted Nerve. It is a remix of The Whistle Song from Lumidee's second album Unexpected.

Track listing
Scandinavian Maxi-Single

Source:

Charts

References

Lumidee songs
Songs written by Lumidee
Songs written by Wyclef Jean
Songs written by Jerry Duplessis
Song recordings produced by Jerry Duplessis
2008 singles
Songs written by Andrew White (musician)
2008 songs